Princess Street is one of the main streets in the city centre of Manchester, England. It begins at Cross Street and runs approximately eastwards across Mosley Street, Portland Street and Whitworth Street until the point where it continues as Brook Street and eventually joins the A34.

History

It is not clear whether the street was actually named after a princess and the second part of it once bore the name of David Street. Originally a residential street it became the site of many textile warehouses and large office buildings during the 19th century. Some of these have since been demolished but most have been converted to other uses.

Route

The road is two-way as it passes Albert Square, St Peter's Square and its tram stop. It becomes one-way southbound (including for buses and cycles) after Portland Street, and resumes two-way traffic after Major Street. It then crosses the River Medlock and the Rochdale Canal before going under the Mancunian Way and terminating when it becomes Brook Street.

Notable buildings
 Northern Assurance Buildings on the north side
 Manchester Town Hall on the south side
 The Athenaeum, on the north side, 1837, Grade II*, architect Sir Charles Barry
 Princess Buildings, on the south side
 The Pickles Building on the north side, Portland Street corner
 Former Mechanics' Institute 103 Princess Street, 1854, Grade II*, architect John Edgar Gregan (the location of the founding meeting of the Trades Union Congress and in the 20th century the College of Commerce and later the National Museum of Labour History). 
 Central House, on the south side
 Asia House on the south side, Whitworth Street corner, 1910, architect Harry Fairhurst
 Lancaster House on the south side, Whitworth Street corner

See also
List of streets and roads in Manchester

References

Further reading
The Story of the Bale. Manchester: Lloyd's Packing Warehouses Ltd, Princess Street, 1926

Streets in Manchester